The 2012–13 season was Dundee's first season back in the Scottish Premier League. Dundee also competed in the League Cup and the Scottish Cup. Dundee were due to compete in their eighth consecutive season in the Scottish First Division, having been relegated from the Scottish Premier League in 2005. On 16 July 2012, Dundee were invited to join to the SPL to fill the vacancy left by Rangers. Their membership was officially confirmed on 3 August, only one day before the season started.

Summary

Season
Dundee finished twelfth in the Scottish Premier League, and were relegated to the Scottish First Division. They reached the second round of the League Cup and the Quarter-final of the Scottish Cup.

Management
Dundee began the season under the management of Barry Smith. On 20 February 2013, Smith left the club following a twelve-game winless streak and with the side sitting bottom of the Scottish Premier League. Smith's assistant Ray Farningham took over training. On 23 February, John Brown was appointed as interim manager until the end of the season, with the appointment being made permanent on a two-year deal in April.

Results and fixtures

Pre season
A match between Dundee and Bristol City scheduled for 30 July, was cancelled due to the late scheduling of the League Cup causing a clash.

Scottish Premier League

Scottish League Cup

Scottish Cup

Player statistics

Captains

Squad
This section includes all players who have been listed as part of the first team during the season. They may not have made an appearance.
Last updated 18 May 2013

|}

Disciplinary record
Includes all competitive matches.
Last updated 18 May 2013

Team statistics

League table

Division summary

Transfers

Players in

Players out

See also
 List of Dundee F.C. seasons

Notes

References

Dundee
2012andndash;13